Camp Morena is an inland training facility of Naval Base Coronado, in the Mountain Empire region of San Diego County, California.

It is located near the town of Campo, to the north of Lake Morena County Park. 

Camp Morena was formerly used by the California National Guard, and later given to the U.S. Navy.

See also

External links
  Militarymuseum.org: Camp Morena
 Cnic.navy.mil: Camp Morena

United States Navy installations
Military facilities in San Diego County, California
Mountain Empire (San Diego County)